Mazalika (Egyptian Arabic: مزاليكا) is an Egyptian dish made of chicken liver and gizzard.

References

Egyptian cuisine
Chicken dishes